San Marino is an enclave completely within Italy. With little or no resources, the tiny nation has made income selling stamps and coins to tourists. From 1950 through the adoption of the euro in 1999 (by law, 2002 de facto), legal tender coins with dozens of ever changing designs have been produced in abundance by the Italian mint in Rome. These coins have been for the most part numismatically worthless, except for some silver and gold commemoratives.

San Marino has been allowed the privilege by the European bank to issue euro coins, and since then has issues a number of gold and silver commemoratives as well as circulating 2 euro commemoratives.

 5 euro – silver – Turin – 2005
 10 euro – silver – Uniformed Militia – 2005
 20+50 euro – gold set – The Scrovegni Chapel – 2003

2 Euro
Bimetallic
 2004: Bartolomeo Borghesi (historian and numismatist)
 2005: Galileo Galilei (physicist)
 2006: Christopher Columbus (explorer)
 2007: Giuseppe Garibaldi (politician)
 2008: European Year of Intercultural Dialogue
 2009: European Year of Creativity and Innovation

5 euro in BU set
Every year the BU set contains a silver 5 euro coin

5 euro
In 2002–2009 a separate silver 5 euro has been issued every year.

10 euro
In 2002–2009 a silver 10 euro has been issued every year.

20 euro
In 2002–2008 a gold 20 euro has been issued every year.

50 euro
In 2002–2008 a gold 50 euro has been issued every year.

See also

 €2 commemorative coins
 Euro gold and silver commemorative coins (San Marino)

Sources

San Marino
Currencies of San Marino